Tulostoma is a genus of over 100 species of fungi in the family Agaricaceae. Commonly known as stalked puffballs, the cosmopolitan genus consists of species which produce small fruit bodies, characterized by stalks inserted in a socket at the base of the spherical spore-sac opened by a small and apical mouth. The spore-sac contains gleba, a mixture of spores and associated cells; at maturity, the spores are released through one or more apical pores. Tulostoma species prefer xeric microhabitats, savannahs and deserts, and are saprobic—obtaining nutrients by decomposing roots, buried wood and other organic material of plant origin.

The following list of 102 species is compiled from Jorge Eduardo Wright's 1987 world monograph on the Tulostomatales, as well as reports of new taxa described in the literature published since then. Wright included 139 species in his monograph, including 47 "doubtful or critical" species. New species have since been reported from Spain (1992), Mexico (1995), Venezuela (2000), Tunisia (2002), China (2005), and Argentina.

Infrageneric classification
Czech mycologist Zdeněk Pouzar elaborated an infrageneric (below the level of genus) system of classification for Tulostoma species in his 1958 monograph of European taxa. Wright expanded and revised Pouzar's classification system to include all known species:
Subgenus Tulostoma
Series Tubulares
Section Brumalia
Section Hyphales
Section Granulosae
Section Volvulata
Section Meristostoma
Series Fimbriata
Section Fimbriata
Section Poculata
Section Exasperata
Section Dubiostoma
Section Rickiana
Subgenus Lacerostoma
Section Lacerata

Key

Notes

References

Tulostoma species, List of